Hill Park is situated on a hilltop surrounded by a residential area known as PECHS neighborhood of Jamshed Town in Karachi, Sindh, Pakistan.

Description 
Though closely located with, it is different than Kidney Hill Park. Hill Park is located in Jamshed Town, Karachi, was built in the early 1960s, while Kidney Hill Park is located in Gulshan Town, Karachi. As of November 2021, over 15000 tree saplings have been planted for greenery and to overcome expected heat waves in Karachi.

See also 
 List of parks and gardens in Pakistan
 List of parks and gardens in Lahore
 List of parks and gardens in Karachi

References

Parks in Karachi
Tourist attractions in Karachi